Muhammad Ibrahim Mir Sialkoti(1874 AD12 January 1956 AD, 1291 AH - 25 Jumada al-awwal 1375 AH) also known as Ibrahim Mir Sialkoti was Ahl-i Hadith scholar, Islamic scholar, muhaddith, khatib, historian, journalist, writer, religious activist and activist of Tehreek-e-Pakistan. He was also an expert on tafsir (Quranic exegesis) and faqīh (jurisprudence), he wrote several books. Sialkoti is considered one of the companions of Muhammad Ali Jinnah, the founder of Pakistan and Sanaullah Amritsari. In 1945, a party called Jamiat Ulema-e-Islam was formed. Shabbir Ahmad Usmani was its president and Sialkoti was its vice president. Its first meeting was held in Calcutta. Usmani could not attend due to illness then the meeting was chaired by Sialkoti.

Mir Sialkoti was also a major antagonist of Mirza Ghulam Ahmad and the early Ahmadiyya movement and wrote several books rejecting Qadianiat. Mir Sialkoti was one of the founding members of All-India Muslim League.

Biography 
Muhammad Ibrahim Mir Sialkoti was born in 1874 in a religious family of British India's Sialkot. He studied the Quran at home and passed Matric exams in 1895 from Mission High school Gandam Mandi Sialkot. In 1895, after completing his Matric Ibrahim Mir Sialkoti took admission in Sialkot's Murree College where he was a class fellow of British Indian great Urdu poet Allama Iqbal, the Poet of the East and National Poet of Pakistan.

Mir Sialkoti learnt Hadith from Syed Nazeer Husain Dehlavi. Sialkoti knew Arabic and Persian as well.

Works 
Sialkoti has written more than twenty books. Most of them are in Urdu language, some of those are:

 Wadhih Al-Bayan (Tafseer of al-Quran)
 Seerah Al-Mustafa (Biography of Islamic prophet Muhammad)
 Tareekh Ahl-i Hadees (History of Ahl-i Hadees in Indian subcontinent)

Death 
Ibrahim Mir Sialkoti died on 12 January 1956 AD, 25 Jumada al-awwal 1375 AH in Sialkot. His Funeral prayers were offered by Abdullah Ropari and he was buried in Sialkot.

See also 

 Abdullah Ropari
 Abdul Mannan Wazirabadi
Muhammad Sulaiman Salman Mansoorpuri

Bibliography

References 

1874 births
1956 deaths
Pakistani Sunni Muslim scholars of Islam
Pakistan Movement activists from Punjab
Pakistan Movement activists
Murray College alumni
People from Sialkot
Quranic exegesis scholars
Founders of Jamiat Ulama-e-Hind
Ahl-i Hadith people